Anton Vyacheslavovych Zadereyko (born 4 March 1999) is a Ukrainian professional footballer who plays as a goalkeeper.

Club career

Ahrobiznes Volochysk 
He made his professional debut for Ahrobiznes Volochysk in the losing Ukrainian Cup match against Bukovyna Chernivtsi on 18 August 2021.

References

External links
 
 

1999 births
Living people
People from Berdychiv
Ukrainian footballers
Association football goalkeepers
FC Karpaty Lviv players
FC Ahrobiznes Volochysk players
Sportspeople from Zhytomyr Oblast